Naomi Uman is an American and Mexican experimental filmmaker and a visual artist. Uman received an MFA in Filmmaking from CalArts in 1998. Uman's work is often "marked by her signature handmade aesthetic, often shooting, hand-processing and editing her films with the most rudimentary of practices." She was once private chef to Gloria Vanderbilt, Malcolm Forbes, and Calvin Klein. Her award-winning films have screened widely at major international festivals as well as the Guggenheim Museum, the Whitney Museum of American Art, and the Museo de Arte Moderno in Mexico City.

Filmography

 Love of 3 Oranges (1993, 16mm, hand-painted b&w, 10 min.)
GRASS (1997, 16mm, b&w, 3 min.)
Leche (1998, 16mm, b&w, sound, 30 min.)
 Tin Woodsman (2008, 16mm, color, sound, 6 min.)
 Removed (1999, 16mm, color, sound, 6 min.)
 Lay (2006, 16mm, b&w, sound, 15 min.)
 Coda (2008, 16mm, b&w, sound, 3 min.)
 Kalendar (2008, 16mm, color, silent, 11 min.)
 On this Day (2006, 16mm, color, sound, 4 min.)
 Unnamed Film (2008, 16mm, color/b&w, sound, 55 min.)

Awards
Uman was awarded the Guggenheim Fellowship for Film, US & Canada in 2002. In 2008 she was awarded a Media Arts Fellowship by Tribeca Film Institute.

References

Living people
American women film directors
Jewish American artists
Jewish feminists
California Institute of the Arts alumni
Film directors from New York City
20th-century American artists
20th-century American women artists
21st-century American artists
21st-century American women artists
Year of birth missing (living people)
21st-century American Jews